Nakhcheer or Chal-Nakhjir is a cave situated in Markazi Province of Iran. It is a limestone cave approximately 70 million years old. Parts of the cave including its internal lake have been prepared for easy tourist access. It was discovered in 1989 and registered as a national monument in 2001. Its interior is made of crystals, dolomite sediments, stalactites and stalagmites.

See also
List of caves in Iran
Geography of Iran

References

Archaeological sites in Iran
Caves of Iran
Tourist attractions in Markazi Province
Delijan County
Landforms of Markazi Province